Pinegrove School, established in 1991, in Solan, Himachal Pradesh, India, is a co-educational, purely residential, English medium public school affiliated to the Central Board of Secondary Education(CBSE), Delhi, up to the senior secondary stage (12th Grade).

The school is accredited with ISO 9001:2000 (BSI) and is also a member  of the Indian Public Schools' Conference (IPSC). The school is also a member of the IAYP (International Award for Young People's Programme) also known as the Duke of Edinburgh's Award Scheme.

Pinegrove School is divided into two Wings located in the  Shimla Hills. The Dharampur wing of the school is situated in a wooded area, with the  Subathu wing located in the  valley of Kuthar, both in District Solan, in the State of Himachal Pradesh, India.

Campus
Pinegrove School,  Dharampur and Subathu  are both located on the Shimla ranges and are situated in  the Kasauli Hills in the Solan district of the State of Himachal Pradesh, in northern India.

Curriculum
The school is affiliated to the Central Board of Secondary Education, Delhi (CBSE), till the senior secondary level (+2). The curriculum follows the National Council of Educational Research and Training (NCERT) and the syllabi are framed by the Central Board of Secondary Education (CBSE), of the Government of India. Students prepare for the All India Secondary and Senior Secondary School Examinations, conducted by the CBSE, Delhi.

The syllabus provides for and examines a student in English, Hindi, Mathematics, Science (with Practicals), and Social Science. SUPW (Hobbies and Work Experience), Music, Art Education and Physical Education are compulsory. From Class III to Class VIII a third language, Punjabi is also taught. The school is offers Science (Medical and Non-Medical) and Commerce stream with or without Computer Education (Informatics Practices) and Mathematics. Fine Arts and Physical Education are also available as optional subjects.

Classrooms and teacher-student ratio
The class-section average strength is round 25 pupils in junior classes and 30 pupils in senior classes. The teacher-student ratio is a 1:12. All classrooms are equipped with smartclass which are networked with the computer laboratory to assist teachers in conducting computer-aided-teaching (CAT) lessons.

Activities
Children at Pinegrove select a number of 'hobby' activities, which they pursue at different times of the year, including Art, Computers, Needlework, Indian Classical Music & Dance, Bugle and Brass Bands, Western Music,  and tree planting which has been an annual activity over the decades. Dramatics, Debating, Elocution and Quiz contests are also regular features. Each House produces a House Show each year, giving students of all ages a chance to perform live on the stage, or learn the arts of stage management and production.

Sports
Physical activity is part of the curriculum, and sports include cricket, hockey, soccer, basketball, badminton, table tennis, athletics, swimming, and gymnastics. Interactions with other schools through sporting and cultural activities are a regular feature of the weekend programme. Camping and trekking are an integral part of the life of the school.

References

External links
Official website

Boarding schools in Himachal Pradesh